The 56th Cannes Film Festival started on 14 May and ran until 25 May 2003. French opera and theatre director, filmmaker, actor and producer Patrice Chéreau was the President of the Jury. The Palme d'Or went to the American film Elephant by Gus Van Sant based on the Columbine High School massacre.

The festival opened with Fanfan la Tulipe, directed by Gérard Krawczyk and closed with Charlie: The Life and Art of Charles Chaplin, directed by Richard Schickel. Monica Bellucci was the mistress of ceremonies.

Juries

Main competition
The following people were appointed as the Jury for the feature films of the 2003 Official Selection:
 Patrice Chéreau (France), Jury President
 Aishwarya Rai (India)
 Meg Ryan (United States)
 Karin Viard (France)
 Erri De Luca (Italy)
 Jean Rochefort (France)
 Steven Soderbergh (United States)
 Danis Tanović (Bosnia and Herzegovina)
 Jiang Wen (China)

Un Certain Regard
The following people were appointed as the Jury of the 2003 Un Certain Regard:
 Abderrahmane Sissako (director) (Mauritania) President
 Alexis Campion
 Christine Masson
 Geoff Andrew
 Jannike Ahlund
 Pierre Todeschini

Cinéfondation and short films
The following people were appointed as the Jury of the Cinéfondation and short films competition:
 Emir Kusturica (director) (Serbia and Montenegro) President
 Ingeborga Dapkunaite (actress) (Lithuania)
 Mary Lea Bandy (director of Patrimoine Au Moma) (United States)
 Michel Ocelot (director) (France)
 Zabou Breitman (actress, director) (France)

Camera d'Or
The following people were appointed as the Jury of the 2003 Camera d'Or:
 Wim Wenders (director) (Germany)
 Agnès Godard (cinematographer) (France)
 Alain Champetier (Representative of the technical industries) (France)
 Bernard Uhlmann (cinephile) (Switzerland)
 Christian Vincent (director) (France)
 Claude Makovski (cinephile) (France)
 Géraldine d'Haen (secretary of the jury) (France)
 Gian Luca Farinelli (cinephile) (Italy)
 Laurent Aknin (critic) (France)

Official selection

In competition - Feature film
The following feature films competed for the Palme d'Or: The Palme d'Or winner has been highlighted.

Un Certain Regard
The following films were selected for the competition of Un Certain Regard:

 All Tomorrow's Parties by Yu Lik-wai
 American Splendor by Shari Springer Berman, Robert Pulcini
 The Best of Youth (La meglio gioventù) by Marco Tullio Giordana
 Crimson Gold (Talaye Sorkh) by Jafar Panahi
 Drifters by Wang Xiaoshuai
 Japanese Story by Sue Brooks
 Kiss of Life by Emily Young
 Playing 'In the Company of Men' (En jouant 'Dans la compagnie des hommes) by Arnaud Desplechin
 Robinson's Crusoe (Lu bin xun piao liu ji) by Lin Cheng-sheng
 September by Max Färberböck
 Soldiers of Salamina (Soldados de Salamina) by David Trueba
 The Southern Cross (La cruz del sur) by Pablo Reyero
 Stormy Weather (Stormviðri) by Sólveig Anspach
 A Story That Begins at the End (Arimpara) by Murali Nair
 Struggle by Ruth Mader
 A Thousand Months (Mille mois) by Faouzi Bensaïdi
 Today and Tomorrow (Hoy y mañana) by Alejandro Chomski
 Where Is Madame Catherine? (Les mains vides) by Marc Recha
 Young Adam by David Mackenzie

Films out of competition
The following films were selected to be screened out of competition:

 Charlie: The Life and Art of Charles Chaplin by Richard Schickel
 Claude Sautet ou La magie invisible by N. T. Binh
 Coming and Going (Vai~E~Vem) by João César Monteiro
 Easy Riders, Raging Bulls by Kenneth Bowser
 Fanfan la Tulipe by Gérard Krawczyk
 The Fog of War by Errol Morris
 Ghosts of the Abyss by James Cameron
 Il grido d'angoscia dell'uccello predatore (20 tagli d'Aprile) by Nanni Moretti
 The Last Customer by Nanni Moretti
 Mansion By The Lake by Lester James Peries
 Les marches etc... (une comédie musicale) by Gilles Jacob
 The Matrix Reloaded by The Wachowskis
 Modern Times by Charlie Chaplin
 S-21, la machine de mort Khmère rouge by Rithy Panh
 The Soul of a Man by Wim Wenders
 Time of the Wolf (Le Temps du Loup) by Michael Haneke
 The Triplets of Belleville (Les Triplettes de Belleville) by Sylvain Chomet
 Who Killed Bambi? (Qui a tué Bambi?) by Gilles Marchand

Cinéfondation
The following short films were selected for the competition of Cinéfondation:

 19 At 11 by Michael Schwartz
 Am See by Ulrike von Ribbeck
 Bezi zeko bezi by Pavle Vučković
 Dremano oko by Vladimir Perisic
 Fish Never Sleep by Gaëlle Denis
 Five Deep Breaths by Seith Mann
 Free Loaders by Haim Tabakman
 Historia del desierto (short) by Celia Galan Julve
 Hitokoroshi no ana by Ikeda Chihiro
 Le pacte by Heidi Maria Faisst
 Like Twenty Impossibles by Annemarie Jacir
 Mechanika by David Sukup
 Rebeca a esas alturas by Luciana Jauffred Gorostiza
 Stuck by Jeremy Roberts
 The Box Man by Nirvan Mullick
 The Water Fight by Norah McGettigan
 TV City by Alejandra Tomei, Alberto Couceiro
 Empty for Love by Vimukthi Jayasundara
 Wonderful Day by Hyun-Pil Kim
 Zero by Carolina Rivas

Short film competition
The following short films competed for the Short Film Palme d'Or:

 Cracker Bag by Glendyn Ivin
 L'enfant promis by Marsa Makris
 Fast Film by Virgil Widrich
 La fenêtre ouverte by Philippe Barcinski
 L'homme le plus beau du monde by Alicia Duffy
 L'homme sans tête by Juan Solanas
 Je germe by Esther Rots
 Mon frère aveugle by Sophie Goodhart
 Neige au mois de Novembre by Karolina Jonsson

Parallel sections
International Critics' Week
The following films were screened for the 42nd International Critics' Week (42e Semaine de la Critique):Feature film competition 20H17, Rue Darling by Bernard Edmond (Canada)
 Deux Fereshté (Two Angels) by Mamad Haghighat (Iran)
 Elle est des nôtres by Siegrid Alnoy (France)
 Entre ciclones by Enrique Colina (Cuba)
 Milwaukee, Minnesota by Allan Mindel (United States)
 Reconstruction by Christoffer Boe (Denmark)
 Since Otar Left (Depuis qu'Otar est parti...) by Julie Bertuccelli (France, Belgium, Georgia)Short film competition Belarra by Koldo Almandoz (Spain)
 Derrière les fagots by Ron Dyens (France)
 Love Is the Law by Eivind Tolas (Norway)
 Maste by Erik Rosenlund (Sweden)
 La Petite Fille by Licia Eminenti (France)
 The Truth About the Head by Dale Heslip (Canada)
 Turangawaewae by Peter Burger (New Zealand)Special screenings Off the map by Campbell Scott (United States) (opening film)
 Camarades by Marin Karmitz (France) (La séance du Parrain)
 Condor : les axes du mal by Rodrigo Vasque (France) (Documentary)
 Araki – The Killing of a Japanese Photographer by Anders Morgenthaller (Denmark) (Short film)
 Good Night by Chun Sun-Young (South Korea) (Short film)
 Nosferatu Tango by Zoltán Horváth (Switzerland, France) (Short film)
 B.B. & Il Cormorano by Edoardo Gabbriellini (Italy) (closing film)

Directors' Fortnight
Apart from 16 short films, the following feature films were screened for the 2003 Directors' Fortnight (Quinzaine des Réalizateurs): 

 Bright Leaves (doc.) by Ross McElwee (United States, United Kingdom)
 Carême by José Álvaro Morais (Portugal)
 La chose publique by Mathieu Amalric (France)
 Cry No More (Les Yeux secs) by Narjiss Nejjar (France, Morocco)
 Deep Breath by Parviz Shahbazi (Iran)
 Feathers in My Head (Des plumes dans la tête) by Thomas De Thier (Belgium, France)
 Gozu by Takashi Miike (Japan)
 The Hours of the Day (Las horas del día) by Jaime Rosales (Spain)
 Interstella 5555 by Kazuhisa Takenouchi (Japan, France)
 L'Isola by Costanza Quatriglio (Italy)
 James' Journey to Jerusalem by Ra'anan Alexandrowicz (Israel)
 Kitchen Stories (Salmer fra Kjøkkenet) by Bent Hamer (United States, Norway)
 Kleine Freiheit by Yüksel Yavuz (Germany)
 Les Lionceaux by Claire Doyon (France)
 Love Film (Filme de amor) by Júlio Bressane (Brazil)
 Mike Brant - Laisse moi t'aimer (doc.) by Erez Laufer (France, Israel)
 Le Monde vivant by Eugène Green (France, Belgium)
 The Mother by Roger Michell (United Kingdom)
 Naked Childhood (L'enfance nue) by Maurice Pialat (France)
 Niki and Flo (Niki Ardelean, colonel în rezerva) by Lucian Pintilie (Romania, France)
 No pasarán, album souvenir (doc.) by Henri-François Imbert (France)
 No Rest for the Brave (Pas de repos pour les braves) by Alain Guiraudie (France, Austria)
 Osama by Siddiq Barmak (Afghanistan, Netherlands, Japan, Ireland, Iran)
 Saltimbank by Jean-Claude Biette (France)
 Seducing Doctor Lewis (La grande séduction) by Jean-François Pouliot (Canada)
 The Forest (Le Silence de la forêt) by Bassek ba Kobhio, Didier Ouénangaré (Cameroon, France)
 Sansa by Siegfried (Spain, France)
 Les Terres de l'ogre by Sami Kafati (Honduras, France)
 Watermark by Georgina Willis (Australia)
 The Woman Who Believed She Was President of the United States (A Mulher que Acreditava ser Presidente dos Estados Unidos da América) by João Botelho (Portugal)
 Im Anfang war der Blick by Bady Minck (Austria/Luxembourg)

Awards

Official awards
The following films and people received the 2003 Official selection awards:
 Palme d'Or: Elephant by Gus Van Sant
 Grand Prix: Uzak by Nuri Bilge Ceylan
 Best Director: Elephant by Gus Van Sant
 Best Screenplay: Les Invasions barbares by Denys Arcand
 Best Actress: Marie-Josée Croze for Les Invasions barbares
 Best Actor: Muzaffer Özdemir and Emin Toprak for Uzak
 Jury Prize:  At Five in the Afternoon (Panj é asr) by Samira MakhmalbafUn Certain Regard Un Certain Regard Award: The Best of Youth (La meglio gioventù) by Marco Tullio Giordana
 Le Premier Regard Award: Mille mois by Faouzi Bensaïdi
 Un Certain Regard Jury Prize: Talaye sorkh by Jafar PanahiCinéfondation First Prize: Run Rabbit Run (Beži zeko beži) by Pavle Vučković
 Second Prize: Historia del desierto by Celia Galan Julve
 Third Prize: TV City by Alejandra Tomei and Alberto Couceiro & Rebeca a esas alturas by Luciana Jauffred GorostizaGolden Camera Caméra d'Or: Reconstruction by Christoffer Boe
 Caméra d'Or - Special Mention: Osama by Siddiq BarmakShort films Short Film Palme d'Or: Cracker Bag by Glendyn Ivin
 Short Film Jury Prize: L'homme sans tête by Juan Solanas

Independent awardsFIPRESCI Prizes The Hours of the Day (Las horas del día) by Jaime Rosales (Director's Fortnight)
 Father and Son (Otets i syn) by Alexander Sokurov (In competition)
 American Splendor by Shari Springer Berman, Robert Pulcini (Un Certain Regard)Vulcan Award of the Technical Artist Vulcan Award: Tom Stern for cinematography in Mystic RiverEcumenical Jury Prize of the Ecumenical Jury: At Five in the Afternoon (Panj é asr) by Samira MakhmalbafAward of the Youth A Thousand Months (Mille mois) by Faouzi BensaïdiAwards in the frame of International Critics' Week International Critics' Week Grand Prix: Since Otar Left (Depuis qu'Otar est parti...) by Julie Bertuccelli
 Prix de la (Toute) Jeune Critique: Milwaukee, Minnesota by Allan Mindel
 Canal+ Award: Love Is the Law by Eivind Tolas
 Kodak Short Film Award: The Truth About the Head by Dale Heslip
 Young Critics Award - Best Short: The Truth About the Head by Dale Heslip
 Young Critics Award - Best Feature: Milwaukee, Minnesota by Allan Mindel
 Grand Golden Rail: Since Otar Left (Depuis qu'Otar est parti...) by Julie Bertuccelli
 Small Golden Rail: Love Is the Law by Eivind TolasOther awards Honorary Golden Palm: Jeanne Moreau
 Cinema Prize of the French National Education System: Elephant by Gus Van Sant
 Golden Coach: Mystic River by Clint Eastwood
 AFCAE Award: Osama by Siddiq BarmakAssociation Prix François Chalais'''
 François Chalais Award: S-21: The Khmer Rouge Killing Machine (S-21, la machine de mort Khmère rouge'') by Rithy Panh

References

Media
INA: Opening of the 2003 Festival (commentary in French)
INA: List of winners of the 2003 Festival and reactions (commentary in French)

External links

 2003 Cannes Film Festival (web.archive)
 Official website Retrospective 2003 
 Cannes Film Festival Awards for 2003 at Internet Movie Database

Cannes Film Festival
Cannes Film Festival
Cannes Film Festival
Cannes Film Festival
Cannes Film Festival
Cannes Film Festival